Deutsches Theater is the name of several theatres which were founded to promote German language and literature, oftentimes in the 19th century as counterparts to Italian operas:

Deutsches Theater (Berlin)
Deutsches Theater (Göttingen)
Deutsches Theater (Hanover)
Deutsches Theater (Munich)
Deutsches Theater (Oslo)

It's also the former name of the following theatres:
State Opera (Prague)
Hoogduitse Schouwburg, Amsterdam